The Pan Pacific Suzhou is a luxury hotel located at 259 Xinshi Road (新市路259号) in Gusu District, Suzhou, China. Part of the Pan Pacific Hotels and Resorts chain, the hotel neighbors Pan Gate.

References

External links

 
 
 Pan Pacific Suzhou at Lonely Planet

Hotels in Suzhou
Hotel buildings completed in 1996
Hotels established in 1996